Bag Reza (also Romanized as Bag Rezā; also known as Beyg Reẕā, ‘Alīābād-e Beyg Reẕā, and ‘Alīābād-e Beyg Rezā) is a village in Qaedrahmat Rural District, Zagheh District, Khorramabad County, Lorestan Province, Iran. At the 2006 census, its population was 319, in 71 families.

References 

Towns and villages in Khorramabad County